Keegan Phiri (born 9 September 1983) is a retired Zambian football striker.

References

1983 births
Living people
Zambian footballers
Zambia international footballers
Nkwazi F.C. players
NAPSA Stars F.C. players
Association football forwards